Arcadia DeVille is a fictional character, a mutant appearing in American comic books published by Marvel Comics. Her first appearance was in X-Force vol. 1 #83.

Fictional character biography
Arcadia Deville is a mutant with the ability to alter reality.  As a child, the Damocles Foundation held Arcadia captive and did experiments on her. She used her reality-altering powers to create a fantasy world where adventured for years, until she was released by Ulysses Dragonblood. They fled and eventually stopped in Kentucky where they mistook Cannonball for a threat until members of the Damocles Foundation known as the Sword noticed their fight and tried to capture them.

Arcadia saw that Cannonball had a photograph of X-Force (Siryn, Danielle Moonstar, Warpath, Meltdown and Sunspot) and used her powers to summon his friends, but the Sword took advantage of the confusion and defeated X-Force. Cannonball and Meltdown stopped the Sword, and Arcadia changed some of them into crystal so that she could smash them. Moonstar touched Arcadia trying to stop her, but Arcadia's power went into Moonstar and shared Arcadia's powers with her. Ulysses stopped Arcadia, and the Sword members reverted to their normal forms. Ulysses and Arcadia continued on the run with the Sword as prisoners on their own ship.

Arcadia began having dreams about the Demon Bear. She and Ulysses went to Sledge's junkyard because they knew that the Damocles Foundation intended to activate a Gatherer of the Celestials.  X-Force also came to the junkyard, and then they all went to the Damocles Foundation's Brazilian base, where they freed the captured Selene and Sunspot. They stopped Odysseus Indigo from reawakening the Gatherer, but when Selene took possession of the Gatherer, Moonstar and Arcadia used their powers together to destroy it.

Arcadia, Ulysses and Sledge went back to the junkyard, but her out of control powers created the Demon Bear which attacked. Arcadia went to find Moonstar in San Francisco, but the Demon Bear followed her, and being near to Moonstar caused their powers to become uncontrollable again, and they were both trapped inside the Demon Bear. They learned that Arcadia's powers had created the bear, so they used their powers to destroy the bear.

Absorbing the bear's energy was too much for Arcadia and she lost control of herself, becoming replaced by one of her creations from childhood which had come to life, until X-Force, Risque and Ulysses released Arcadia.

Powers and abilities
Arcadia Deville can alter reality using images in her mind, and her powers have allowed her to teleport people, and also change people into another substance or another type of creature. The effects caused by her powers end when she is not conscious.

References

External links

Fictional characters who can manipulate reality
Marvel Comics characters who can teleport
Marvel Comics mutants
Marvel Comics superheroes